Hennie is a given name, often a short form (hypocorism) of Hendrik or Hendrikus. It may refer to:

Men:
 Hennie Aucamp (1934–2014), South African Afrikaans poet, short story writer, cabaretist and academic
 Hennie Bekker (born 1934), Zambian-born composer, arranger, producer and keyboardist now based in Canada
 Hendrik Hennie Bester, South African rear admiral who served in the South African Navy from 1968 to 2008
 Hennie Binneman (1914–1968), South African cyclist
 Hendrik Hennie Daniller (born 1984), South African rugby union footballer
 Hendrikus Hennie Dompeling (born 1966), Dutch sport shooter
 Hendrikus Hennie Hollink (born 1931), Dutch former football player and manager
 Hennie Jacobs (born 1981), South African-born musician, songwriter and actor
 Hendrikus Hennie Keetelaar (1927-2002), Dutch water polo player
 Hendrikus Hennie Kuiper (born 1949), Dutch former road racing cyclist and Olympic and world champion
 Hendrik Hennie le Roux (born 1967), South African former rugby union footballer
 Hendrik Hennie Muller (1922-1977), South African rugby union footballer
 Hendrik Hennie Otto (born 1976), South African golfer
 Heinrich Hennie Quentemeijer (1920-1974), Dutch Olympic heavyweight boxer
 Alfred Henry Hennie Skorbinski (born 1990), South African rugby union player
 Henry Smoyer (1890–1958), Major League Baseball player in 1912
 Hennie Spijkerman (born 1950), Dutch football coach and manager and former goalkeeper
 Henrikus Hennie Stamsnijder (born 1954), Dutch former cyclo-cross and road racing cyclist

Women:
 Hendrika Hennie Penterman (born 1951), Dutch former swimmer
 Hennie Top (born 1956), Dutch former cyclist
H’Hen Nie (born 1992), Vietnamese beauty pageant finished in Top 5 at Miss Universe 2018

See also
 Henny
 Henie

Hypocorisms
Dutch feminine given names
Dutch masculine given names
Unisex given names